

C

References